Gavin Fitness (born 4 June 1968) is an Australian cricketer. He played in three first-class and four List A matches for Queensland between 1993 and 2001.

See also
 List of Queensland first-class cricketers

References

External links
 

1968 births
Living people
Australian cricketers
Queensland cricketers
People from Maryborough, Queensland
Cricketers from Queensland